Rocklands is a popular bouldering destination in South Africa. It is located under 200km from Cape Town, on the edge of the Cederberg Mountains.

The area is known for its abundance of bright-orange sandstone boulders. Boulderers have frequented Rocklands since 1996, when Todd Skinner, Fred Nicole, and others began documenting bouldering routes in the area.

References 

Climbing areas of South Africa